Cheung Kin Man (born 15 June 1932) is a Hong Kong former freestyle and backstroke swimmer. He competed at the 1952, 1956 and the 1960 Summer Olympics. He finished fifth in the 1954 British Empire and Commonwealth Games 110 yards freestyle and was eliminated in the heats of the 110 yards backstroke.

References

External links
 

1932 births
Living people
Hong Kong male backstroke swimmers
Hong Kong male freestyle swimmers
Olympic swimmers of Hong Kong
Swimmers at the 1952 Summer Olympics
Swimmers at the 1956 Summer Olympics
Swimmers at the 1960 Summer Olympics
Commonwealth Games competitors for Hong Kong
Swimmers at the 1954 British Empire and Commonwealth Games
Swimmers at the 1954 Asian Games
Asian Games competitors for Hong Kong